Syed Saleh Muhammad Shah commonly known as Fateh Khan was a Pakistani news anchor and radio broadcaster. He was known for his popular programme Fateh Khan ji Katchery.

References

1937 births
2007 deaths
Pakistani broadcasters
Pakistani radio presenters
Sindhi people
People from Hyderabad District, Pakistan